Gulliverzone is a 1997 young adult novel by Stephen Baxter.

References
 Review on BookPage - The Web: Gulliverzone

1997 British novels
Novels by Stephen Baxter
Novels about virtual reality
Children's science fiction novels
Orion Books books